Michael Anthony DePangher (September 11, 1858 – July 7, 1915) was a professional baseball player who played catcher in the Major Leagues for the 1884 Philadelphia Quakers.

External links

1858 births
1915 deaths
Major League Baseball catchers
Philadelphia Quakers players
19th-century baseball players
East Saginaw Grays players
San Francisco Eagles players
Peoria Reds players
Stockton (minor league baseball) players
Baseball players from California
People from Marysville, California